Esteve Monterde Torrents (born 29 October 1995) is a Spanish footballer who plays as a central midfielder for Club Portugalete.

Club career
Born in Badalona, Barcelona, Catalonia, Esteve represented UDA Gramenet as a youth. He made his debut as a senior with the club in the 2012–13 season in Tercera División, and subsequently joined CF Badalona, returning to youth football.

Definitely promoted to the first team ahead of the 2014–15 campaign, Esteve scored his first senior goal on 23 November 2014, netting the first in a 1–1 draw at UE Cornellà in the Segunda División B championship. On 9 July of the following year he joined Córdoba CF, being assigned to the reserves in the fourth tier.

Esteve made his professional debut on 30 November 2016, coming on as a second half substitute for Carlos Caballero in a 2–0 Copa del Rey home win against Málaga CF. He made his Segunda División debut on 4 December, again from the bench in a 2–1 win at CF Reus Deportiu.

On 12 December 2016, Esteve renewed his contract until 2020, and was promoted to the main squad ahead of the 2017–18 campaign. On 31 August 2018, after spending the past six months with the B-side, he terminated his contract with the club.

References

External links

1995 births
Living people
People from Badalona
Sportspeople from the Province of Barcelona
Spanish footballers
Spanish expatriate footballers
Footballers from Catalonia
Association football midfielders
Segunda División players
Segunda División B players
Tercera División players
UDA Gramenet footballers
CF Badalona players
Córdoba CF B players
Córdoba CF players
UE Cornellà players
Haro Deportivo players
Club Portugalete players
1. deild karla players
Afturelding men's football players
Spanish expatriate sportspeople in Iceland
Expatriate footballers in Iceland